Cypriniformes  is an order of ray-finned fish, including the carps, minnows, loaches, and relatives. Cypriniformes is an  Order within the  Superorder Ostariophysi consisting of "Carp-like" Ostariophysins.  This order contains 11-12 families,  although some authorities have designated as many as 23, over 400 genera, and more than 4,250 species, with new species being described every few months or so, and new genera being recognized frequently. They are most diverse in southeastern Asia, and are entirely absent from Australia and South America. At 112 years old, the longest-lived cypriniform fish documented is the bigmouth buffalo.

Their closest living relatives are the Characiformes (characins and allies), the Gymnotiformes (electric eel and American knifefishes), and the Siluriformes (catfishes).

Description

Like other orders of the Ostariophysi, fishes of Cypriniformes possess a  Weberian apparatus. They differ from most of their relatives in having only a dorsal fin on their backs; most other fishes of Ostariophysi have a small, fleshy adipose fin behind the dorsal fin. Further differences are the Cypriniformes' unique kinethmoid, a small median bone in the snout, and the lack of teeth in the mouth. Instead, they have convergent structures called pharyngeal teeth in the throat. While other groups of fish, such as cichlids, also possess pharyngeal teeth, the cypriniformes' teeth grind against a chewing pad on the base of the skull, instead of an upper pharyngeal jaw.

The most notable family placed here is the Cyprinidae (carps and minnows), which make up two-thirds of the order's diversity. This is one of the largest families of fish, and is widely distributed across Africa, Eurasia, and North America. Most species are strictly freshwater inhabitants, but a considerable number are found in brackish water, such as roach and bream. At least one species is found in saltwater, the Pacific redfin, Tribolodon brandtii. Brackish water and marine cyprinids are invariably anadromous, swimming upstream into rivers to spawn.  Sometimes separated as family Psilorhynchidae, they seem to be specially adapted fishes of the Cyprinidae.

The Balitoridae and Gyrinocheilidae are families of mountain-stream fishes feeding on algae and small invertebrates. They are found only in tropical and subtropical Asia. While the former are a speciose group, the latter contain only a handful of species. The suckers (Catostomidae) are found in temperate North America and eastern Asia. These large fishes are similar to carps in appearance and ecology. Members of the Cobitidae are common across Eurasia and parts of North Africa. A midsized group like the suckers, they are rather similar to catfish in appearance and behaviour, feeding primarily off the substrate and equipped with barbels to help them locate food at night or in murky conditions. Fishes in the families Cobitidae, Balitoridae, Botiidae, and Gyrinocheilidae are called loaches, although the last do not seem to belong to the lineage of "true" loaches, but are related to the suckers.

Systematics 

Historically, these included all the forms now placed in the superorder Ostariophysi except the catfish, which were placed in the order Siluriformes. By this definition, the Cypriniformes were paraphyletic, so recently, the orders Gonorhynchiformes, Characiformes, (characins and allies), and Gymnotiformes (knifefishes and electric eels) have been separated out to form their own monophyletic orders.

The families of Cypriniformes are traditionally divided into two suborders. Superfamily Cyprinioidea contains the carps and minnows (Cyprinidae) and also the mountain carps as the family Psilorhynchidae. In 2012, Maurice Kottelat reviewed the superfamily Cobitoidei and under his revision it now consists of the following families: hillstream loaches (Balitoridae), Barbuccidae, Botiidae, suckers (Catostomidae), true loaches (Cobitidae), Ellopostomatidae, Gastromyzontidae, sucking loaches (Gyrinocheilidae), stone loaches (Nemacheilidae), Serpenticobitidae, and long-finned loaches (Vaillantellidae).

Catostomoidea is usually treated as a junior synonym of the Cobitoidei, but it could be split off the Catostomidae and Gyrinocheilidae in a distinct superfamily; the Catostomoidea might be closer relatives of the carps and minnows than of the "true" loaches. While the Cyprinioidea seem more "primitive" than the loach-like forms, they were apparently successful enough never to shift from the original ecological niche of the basal Ostariophysi. Yet, from the ecomorphologically conservative main lineage apparently at least two major radiations branched off. These diversified from the lowlands into torrential river habitats, acquiring similar habitus and adaptations in the process.

The mountain carps are the highly apomorphic Cyprinidae, perhaps close to true carps (Cyprininae), or maybe to the danionins. While some details about the phylogenetic structures of this massively diverse family are known – e.g. that Cultrinae and Leuciscinae are rather close relatives and stand apart from Cyprininae –  no good consensus exists yet on how the main lineages are interrelated. A systematic list, from the most ancient to the most modern lineages, can thus be given as:
 Suborder Cyprinoidei
 Family Acheilognathidae Bleeker, 1863 
 Family Cyprinidae Rafinesque, 1815 (carps, koi, goldfish) and minnows
 Family Danionidae Bleeker, 1863 
 Family Gobionidae Bleeker, 1863
 Family Leptobarbidae Bleeker, 1864
 Family Leuciscidae Bonaparte, 1853
 Family Paedocyprididae Mayden & Chen, 2010 
 Family Psilorhynchidae Hora, 1926
 Family Sundadanionidae Mayden & Chen, 2010
 Family Tanichthyidae Mayden & Chen, 2010
 Family Tincidae Jordan, 1878
 Family Xenocyprididae Günther, 1868
 Suborder Catostomoidei
 Family Catostomidae Agassiz 1850 (suckers)
 Suborder Gyrinocheiloidei
 Family Gyrinocheilidae Gill 1905 (algae eaters; sucking loaches)
 Suborder Cobitoidei
 Family Balitoridae Swainson 1839 (hillstream loaches)
 Family Barbuccidae Kottelat 2012 (scooter/fire-eyed loaches)
 Family Botiidae Berg 1940 (pointface loaches)
 Family Cobitidae Swainson 1838 (true loaches)
 Family Ellopostomatidae Bohlen & Šlechtová 2009 (square-head/sturgeon-mouthed loaches)
 Family Gastromyzontidae Fowler 1905 (sucker loaches)
 Family Nemacheilidae Regan 1911 (brook/stone loaches)
 Family Serpenticobitidae Kottelat 2012 (snake/serpent loaches)
 Family Vaillantellidae Nalbant & Bănărescu 1977 (longfin loaches)

Phylogeny
Phylogeny based on the work of the following works

Evolution
Cypriniformes include the most primitive of the Ostariophysi in the narrow sense (i.e. excluding the Gonorynchiformes). This is evidenced not only by physiological details, but also by their great distribution, which indicates they had the longest time to spread. The earliest that Cypriniformes might have diverged from Characiphysi (Characiformes and relatives) is thought to be about the Early Triassic, about 250 million years ago (mya). However, their divergence probably occurred only with the splitting-up of Pangaea in the Jurassic, maybe 160 million years ago (Mya). By 110 Mya, the plate tectonics evidence indicates that the Laurasian Cypriniformes must have been distinct from their Gondwanan relatives.

The Cypriniformes are thought to have originated in South-east Asia, where the most diversity of this group is found today. The alternative hypothesis is that they began in South America, similar to the other otophysans. If this were the case, they would have spread to Asia through Africa or North America before the continents split up, for these are purely freshwater fishes. As the Characiformes began to diversify and spread, they may have outcompeted South American basal cypriniforms in Africa, where more advanced cypriniforms survive and coexist with characiforms.

The earliest cypriniform fossils are already assignable to the living family Catostomidae; from the Paleocene of Alberta, they are roughly 60 million years old. During the Eocene (55-35 Mya), catostomids and cyprinids spread throughout Asia. In the Oligocene, around 30 Mya, advanced cyprinids began to outcompete catostomids wherever they were sympatric, causing a decline of the suckers. Cyprinids reached North America and Europe about the same time, and Africa in the early Miocene (some 23-20 Mya). The cypriniforms spread to North America through the Bering land bridge, which formed and disappeared again several times during the many millions of years of cypriniform evolution.

Relationship with humans
The Cyprinidae in particular are important in a variety of ways. Many species are important food fish, particularly in Europe and Asia. Some are also important as aquarium fish, of which the goldfish and koi are perhaps the most celebrated. The other families are of less commercial importance. The Catostomidae have some importance in angling, and some "loaches" are bred for the international aquarium fish trade.

Accidentally or deliberately introduced populations of common carp (Cyprinus carpio) and grass carp (Ctenopharyngodon idella) are found on all continents except Antarctica. In some cases, these exotic species have a negative impact on the environment. Carp in particular stir up the riverbed, reducing the clarity of the water, making plant growth difficult.

In science, one of the most famous members of the Cypriniformes is the zebrafish (Danio rerio). The zebrafish is one of the most important vertebrate model organisms in biological and biochemical sciences, being used in many kinds of experiments. During early development, the zebrafish has a nearly transparent body, so it is ideal for studying developmental biology. It is also used for the elucidation of biochemical signaling pathways. They are also good pets, but can be shy in bright light and crowded tanks.

Threats and extinction

Habitat destruction, damming of upland rivers, pollution, and in some cases overfishing for food or the pet trade have driven some Cypriniformes to the brink of extinction or even beyond. In particular, Cyprinidae of southwestern North America have been severely affected; a considerable number went entirely extinct after settlement by Europeans. For example, in 1900 the thicktail chub (Gila crassicauda) was the most common freshwater fish found in California; 70 years later, not a single living individual existed.

The well-known red-tailed black shark (Epalzeorhynchos bicolor) from the Mae Klong River of The Bridge on the River Kwai fame possibly only survives in captivity. Ironically, while pollution and other forms of overuse by humans have driven it from its native home, it is bred for the aquarium fish trade by the thousands. The Yarqon bleak (Acanthobrama telavivensis) from the Yarqon River had to be rescued into captivity from imminent extinction; new populations have apparently been established again successfully from captive stock. The Balitoridae and Cobitidae, meanwhile, contain a very large number of species about which essentially nothing is known except how they look and where they were first found.

Globally extinct Cypriniformes species are:
 Acanthobrama hulensis
 Gökçe balığı, Alburnus akili
 Barbus microbarbis
 Snake River sucker, Chasmistes muriei
 Chondrostoma scodrense
 Cyprinus yilongensis
 Mexican dace, Evarra bustamantei
 Plateau chub, Evarra eigenmanni
 Endorheic chub, Evarra tlahuacensis
 Thicktail chub, Gila crassicauda
 Pahranagat spinedace, Lepidomeda altivelis
 Harelip sucker, Moxostoma lacerum
 Durango shiner, Notropis aulidion
 Phantom shiner, Notropis orca
 Salado shiner, Notropis saladonis
 Clear Lake splittail, Pogonichthys ciscoides
 Las Vegas dace, Rhinichthys deaconi
 Stumptooth minnow, Stypodon signifer
 Telestes ukliva

Notes

References
  (2005): The biogeography of otophysan fishes (Ostariophysi: Otophysi): a new appraisal. J. Biogeogr. 32(2): 287–294.  (HTML abstract)
  (2004a): Family Balitoridae - River loaches. Version of 2004-NOV-22. Retrieved 2007-03-05.
  (2004b): Family Catostomidae - Suckers. Version of 2004-NOV-22. Retrieved 2007-03-05.
  (2004c): Family Cobitidae - Loaches. Version of 2004-NOV-22. Retrieved 2007-03-05.
  (2004d): Family Cyprinidae - Minnows or carps. Version of 2004-NOV-22. Retrieved 2007-03-05.
  (2004e): Family Gyrinocheilidae - Algae eaters. Version of 2004-NOV-22. Retrieved 2007-03-05.
  (2004f): Family Psilorhynchidae - Mountain carps. Version of 2004-NOV-22. Retrieved 2007-03-05.
  (2005): Order Summary for Cypriniformes. Version of 2005-FEB-15. Retrieved 2007-03-05.
  (2006): Florida's Exotic Freshwater Fishes. Retrieved 2007-03-05.
  (2005): Cyprinus carpio (Linnaeus, 1758). Version of 2005-08-03. Retrieved 2007-05-03.
  (2008): Phylogenetic position of the enigmatic genus Psilorhynchus (Ostariophysi: Cypriniformes): Evidence from the mitochondrial genome. Mol. Phylogenet. Evol. 47: 419–425.  (HTML abstract)
  (1997): The Diversity of Fishes. Blackwell Publishing. 
  (2007): [www.iucnredlist.org 2007 IUCN Red List of Threatened Species].
 Kottelat, M. (2012): Conspectus cobitidum: an inventory of the loaches of the world (Teleostei: Cypriniformes: Cobitoidei).  The Raffles Bulletin of Zoology, Suppl. No. 26: 1-199.
  (2006): Fishes of the World. John Wiley & Sons, Inc. 
  [2007]: FishBase - Tribolodon brandtii. Retrieved 2007-03-05.
  (2003): Mitochondrial Genomics of Ostariophysan Fishes: Perspectives on Phylogeny and Biogeography. J. Mol. Evol. 56(4): 464–472.   (HTML abstract)
  (2018): Phylogenetic classification of extant genera of fishes of the order Cypriniformes (Teleostei: Ostariophysi). Zootaxa 4476(1): 006–039.  (HTML abstract)

External links

 Cypriniformes Tree of Life

 
Ray-finned fish orders
Ostariophysi
Fish of Africa
Fish of Europe
Fish of Asia
Fish of North America
Fish of Central America
Extant Thanetian first appearances